Schinia obscurata, the obscure schinia moth,  is a moth of the family Noctuidae. It is found from Ontario and Quebec south into the United States, where it has been recorded from Illinois, New Jersey, South Carolina, Wisconsin, Kansas, Montana, Nebraska, North Dakota, Oklahoma and Texas.

The larvae feed on Erigeron species.

Subspecies
Schinia obscurata obscurata
Schinia obscurata tanena Strecker, 1898

External links
Bug Guide
Butterflies and moths of North America

Schinia
Moths of North America
Taxa named by Herman Strecker
Moths described in 1898